Neptune Lake (also called Lake Ogemaga or Bug Lake or Bass Lake) is a shallow mesotrophic rural lake in Oneida County in northern Wisconsin in the United States, near the intersection of U.S. Route 45 and U.S. Route 8, about  north of Pelican Lake and  northwest of the small settlement of Monico. Two smaller lakes, Mars Lake and Venus Lake, are nearby.

Neptune Lake is used for fishing, particularly panfish, with extant species including Largemouth Bass and Northern Pike, and Bluegill.

References

Lakes of Oneida County, Wisconsin